Michael Turkovich (born November 27, 1986) is a former American football offensive tackle. He was signed by the Dallas Cowboys as an undrafted free agent in 2009. He played college football at Notre Dame.

Professional career

Dallas Cowboys
After going undrafted in the 2009 NFL Draft, Turkovich was signed by the Dallas Cowboys as an undrafted free agent. He was waived/injured after suffering a knee injury during training camp on August 3 and subsequently reverted to injured reserve. He was released with an injury settlement on August 7.

New York Jets
Turkovich signed a future contract with the New York Jets on February 23, 2010. Turkovich would be waived by the New York on September 4, 2010.

Chicago Rush
Turkovich signed with the Chicago Rush of the Arena Football League for the 2011 season. He was one of the team's starting offensive linemen. He was released on June 20, 2011.

Pittsburgh Power
Turkovich signed with the Power on June 21, 2011. However, Turkovich spent the rest of the season on the Refuse to Report list.

References

External links
Just Sports Stats
Notre Dame Fighting Irish bio

1986 births
Living people
Sportspeople from Johnstown, Pennsylvania
Players of American football from Pennsylvania
American football offensive tackles
American football offensive guards
Notre Dame Fighting Irish football players
Dallas Cowboys players
New York Jets players
Pittsburgh Power players
Chicago Rush players